The Dark Romance of a Tobacco Tin is a 1911 silent film comedy short produced by the Essanay Studios of Chicago.  It starred Francis X. Bushman  with an early appearance by Bryant Washburn. The General Film Company distributed the picture. This was a film apparently about blackface and interracial marriage.

Cast
Francis X. Bushman
Harry Cashman
Bryant Washburn

See also
Francis X. Bushman filmography

References

External links
 The Dark Romance of a Tobacco Tin at IMDb.com

1911 films
American silent short films
1911 short films
Essanay Studios films
Silent American comedy films
1911 comedy films
1910s American films